Saint-Jean-de-Moirans (literally Saint-Jean of Moirans) is a commune in the Isère department in southeastern France.

Population

Twin towns — sister cities
Saint-Jean-de-Moirans is twinned with:

  Frossasco, Italy (1998)

See also
Communes of the Isère department

References

Communes of Isère
Isère communes articles needing translation from French Wikipedia